SOBER1 is an enzyme that catalyzes the biochemical reaction of deacetylation. The SOBER (Suppressor of AvrBsT-elicited resistance) 1 protein is conserved in plants and it suppresses the plant's ability to carry out the hypersensitive response against infection by certain pathogenic effector proteins from the YopJ family. SOBER1 belongs to the protein superfamily of α/β hydrolases and possesses a canonical serine/histidine/aspartate catalytic triad to carry out the deacetylation reaction. There have been contradicting reports about SOBER1's potential phospholipase activity, with one study claiming phospholipase A2 activity of the protein and another study being unable to reproduce this result.

Relationship to acyl-protein thioesterases 
Members of the SOBER1 family are considered closely related to acyl-protein thioesterases, judged by their protein structure. However, a change in their amino acid sequence renders SOBER1's biochemical properties into a deacetylase; in particular the hydrophobic tunnel, which is found in acyl-protein thioesterases, is impaired by additional amino acids in the lid structure of SOBER1, creating a new surface for binding of the acetyl group.

Targets 
So far, the following proteins have been identified as SOBER1 targets: AvrBsT; ACIP1.

See also 
Acylation
Catalytic triad
Compendium of protein lysine acetylation
Enzyme assay
Organic synthesis
Protein dynamics
Proteolysis
The Proteolysis Map

References 

Catalysis
Enzymes
Organic reactions
Post-translational modification